Isaac Ganunga (born December 10, 1959) is a retired Malawian middle-distance runner.

He competed in the 1500 metres at the 1984 Olympic Games as well as  the 800 and 1500 metres at the 1986 Commonwealth Games without reaching the final. At the 1987 All-Africa Games he competed in the 4 x 400 metres relay and helped setting a Malawian record that still stands.

References

1959 births
Living people
Malawian male middle-distance runners
Athletes (track and field) at the 1984 Summer Olympics
Olympic athletes of Malawi
Athletes (track and field) at the 1986 Commonwealth Games
Commonwealth Games competitors for Malawi
Athletes (track and field) at the 1987 All-Africa Games
African Games competitors for Malawi